Sverre Bernhard Nybø (24 November 1903 in Oslo – 4 September 1976) was a Norwegian politician for the Conservative Party.

He was elected to the Norwegian Parliament from Møre og Romsdal in 1954, and was re-elected on four occasions.

Nybø was mayor of Vanylven municipality in 1945 and 1959–1961, and deputy mayor in 1947–1950.

References

1903 births
1983 deaths
Conservative Party (Norway) politicians
Members of the Storting
20th-century Norwegian politicians